Christian Anker may refer to:

 Christian Ancher (1711–1765), Norwegian merchant, timber trader and ship owner
 Christian Anker (businessman) (1917–1988), Norwegian businessman
 Christian August Anker (1840–1912), Norwegian industrialist
 Christian August Anker (1896–1982), Norwegian businessman in the paper industry